Secret Men's Business is a 1999 Australian television film about five friends reunited after the death of a former teacher.

Accolades
Simon Baker was nominated for the award for Best Performance by an Actor in a Leading Role in a Telefeature or Mini-Series at the 2000 Australian Film Institute Awards.

References

External links

Secret Men's Business at Cinephilia
Secret Men's Business at Rotten Tomatoes

Australian television films
1999 films
1990s English-language films